The boys' 50 metre backstroke event at the 2018 Summer Youth Olympics took place on 9 and 10 October at the Natatorium in Buenos Aires, Argentina.

Results

Heats
The heats were started on 9 October at 10:38.

Semifinals
The semifinals were started on 9 October at 19:08.

Final

The final was held on 10 October at 18:34.

References

Swimming at the 2018 Summer Youth Olympics